"I Just Wanna Stop" is a song by Canadian singer/songwriter Gino Vannelli. Released as a single in August 1978, it remains his biggest hit single to date, reaching No. 1 in his native Canada and No. 4 on the U.S. Billboard Hot 100. It appears on his sixth album, Brother to Brother. The recording was produced by Gino and his brothers, Joe and Ross Vannelli; the song was written by Ross. It received a nomination for Grammy Award for Best Male Pop Vocal Performance.

Track listing
UK 7" single
A. "I Just Wanna Stop" - 3:37
B. "The Surest Things Can Change" - 4:35

Chart performance

Weekly singles charts

Year-end charts

Cover versions
 R&B/jazz singer Angela Bofill recorded it as part of her 1988 Capitol release, Intuition. This version peaked at No. 11 on the soul chart.
 In 2013, Brazilian singer Maurício Manieri's rendition was featured on the Rede Record TV series Pecado Mortal.

Reconstruction with Jerry Garcia on 3/7/1979 in San Ragael, CA at Rancho Nicasio

References

External links
 
 

1978 songs
1978 singles
Gino Vannelli songs
RPM Top Singles number-one singles
A&M Records singles
Soul ballads
Angela Bofill songs
1970s ballads